WXNK (940 AM) is a radio station broadcasting an active rock format. Licensed to Shell Lake, Wisconsin, United States, the station is currently owned by Zoe Communications, Inc.

History
On June 1, 2018, WCSW changed their call letters to WXNK and changed their format from news/talk to active rock, branded as "Ink 92.7" (simulcast on FM translator W224DN Shell Lake).

Former talk programming
In addition to Fox News Radio updates, the station also previously carried Boston based host Howie Carr, Laura Ingraham, The Rush Limbaugh Show and Michael Savage.

References

External links

XNK
XNK
Active rock radio stations in the United States
Radio stations established in 1967
1967 establishments in Wisconsin